Gulf and Western Industries, Inc. (stylized as Gulf+Western) was an American conglomerate.  Originally, the company focused on manufacturing and resource extraction. Beginning in 1966, and continuing throughout the 1960s and 1970s, the company purchased a number of entertainment companies, most notably Paramount Pictures in 1966, Desilu Productions in 1967, and a number of record companies, including Dot Records (a subsidiary of Paramount Pictures at the time of purchase) and Blue Thumb Records. These became the nuclei of Paramount Television and Famous Music respectively.

The company sold its non-publishing and entertainment assets through the course of the 1980s, with the company re-branding itself as Paramount Communications in 1989.  A controlling interest of Paramount Communications was purchased by Viacom in 1994, and the entertainment assets of Gulf and Western are today part of the media conglomerate Paramount Global (the Paramount name was also used by the Gulf and Western holding company when it renamed itself Paramount Communications in 1989).

History

Bluhdorn period 
Gulf and Western's origins date to the 1934 founding of the Michigan Bumper Corporation, although Charles Bluhdorn treated his 1956 takeover of Michigan Plating and Stamping Company as its "founding" for the purpose of later anniversaries. In 1957, Michigan Plating and Stamping acquired the Beard & Stone Electric Company of Houston, Texas, and changed its name to Gulf and Western Corporation in 1958. The name reflected the company's operations in Houston near the Gulf of Mexico and its intent to serve the growing automotive industry in the Western United States.

Under Bluhdorn the company diversified into a variety of businesses that included stamping metal bumpers, financial services, manufacturing, apparel, home and consumer products, agricultural, auto parts, natural resources, building products, entertainment, and publishing. A partial list of Gulf and Western's holdings between 1958 and 1982 with the year of acquisition in parentheses:

 Hendrie & Bolthoff Manufacturing & Supply Company (1961)
 Lenape Forge, acquired from Charles Moore (1965)
 Paramount Pictures (1966)
 New Jersey Zinc (1966)
 Universal American, including The American Pulley Company, Morse Cutting Tools and Bohn Aluminum and Brass Corporation (1966)
 Taylor Forge (1967)
 Bonney Forge (1967)
 Collyer Insulated Wire (1967)
 North & Judd Manufacturing Company, including Wilcox, Crittenden & Company subsidiary (1967)
 Unicord (1967)
 South Puerto Rico Sugar Company (1967), a holding company in Jersey City, New Jersey, with a principal subsidiary, called South Porto Rico Sugar Company, a cane sugar refiner in Ensenada, Guánica, Puerto Rico which owned the Central Guánica, purported to once be the largest cane sugar refinery in the world.
 Associates First Capital Corporation (1968), a financial services company.
 Brown Company (1968)
 Consolidated Cigar (1968)
 Stax Records (1968)
 Sega (1969)
 Compañía Insular Tabacalera (1972)
 Schrafft's (1974)
 Hammacher Schlemmer (1975)
 Kayser-Roth (1975), a clothing company that owned the Miss Universe pageant because it had bought Pacific Mills, which had invented the pageant to sell its Catalina Swimwear brand.
 Simon & Schuster (1975)
 Madison Square Garden and by extension the New York Rangers and New York Knicks (1977)
 Simmons Bedding Company (1979)
 Thomas Ryder & Son, of Bolton, England, a machine tool manufacturing company, acquired from Whitecroft (1981)

With the Paramount acquisition, Gulf and Western became parent company of the Dot Records label and the Famous Music publishing company, created in 1928 by Famous-Lasky Corp., Paramount's predecessor. After Stax was acquired, that label became a subsidiary of Dot, although Dot was not at all mentioned on the label (rather, Dot and Stax were noted as subsidiaries of Paramount). Later on, the record operation was moved under Famous Music and renamed the Famous Music Corporation.

In 1967, the company also purchased Lucille Ball's Desilu Productions library, which included most of her television product, as well as such properties as Star Trek and Mission: Impossible, both of which would rank amongst its most profitable commodities over the years. Desilu was renamed Paramount Television.

Gulf and Western sold Stax back to its original owners in 1970, and with it the rights to all Stax recordings not owned by Atlantic Records. A year before, Dot's non-country music roster and catalog was moved to a newly created label, Paramount Records (the name was previously used by a Paramount Records label unrelated to the film studio; Paramount acquired the rights to that name in order to launch this label). It assumed Dot's status as the flagship label of Paramount's record operations, releasing music by pop artists and soundtracks from Paramount's films and television series. Dot meanwhile became a country label.

Famous Music provided distribution for several independent labels, such as Neighborhood Records and Sire Records. Famous began distributing yet another independent label, Blue Thumb Records, in 1971, before buying it outright in 1972. In 1974, Gulf and Western sold the entire record operation to the American Broadcasting Company, which continued the Dot and Blue Thumb imprints as subsidiaries of ABC Records, while discontinuing the Paramount label altogether.

While working for Paramount, Barry Diller had proposed a "fourth network"; ultimately, the Paramount Television Service was cancelled six months prior to launch by Bluhdorn, who feared a major loss of revenue had the network gone forward. Diller later left Paramount for 20th Century Fox; that studio's new owner, News Corporation, was interested in starting a network, which became the Fox Broadcasting Company.

Early 1980s 
By year's end, the U.S. Department of Energy (which had invested $15 million in the project) reported that the battery had 65% less power than predicted and could be recharged only by highly trained personnel.

In 1981, former officials of Gulf and Western Natural Resources Group led a buyout of New Jersey Zinc and made it a subsidiary of Horsehead Industries, Inc.

In 1983, Bluhdorn died of a heart attack on a plane en route home from the Dominican Republic to New York, and the board bypassed president Jim Judelson and named senior vice president Martin S. Davis, who had come up through Paramount Pictures, as the new chief executive officer.

Martin S. Davis restructuring 
Davis slimmed down the company's wilder diversifications and focused it on entertainment, selling all of its non-entertainment and publishing assets. The idea was to aid financial markets in measuring the company's success, which, in turn, would help place better value on its shares. Though its Paramount division had done very well in recent years, Gulf and Western's success as a whole was translating poorly with investors. This process eventually led Davis to divest many of the company's subsidiaries.

In 1983, Gulf and Western sold Consolidated Cigar Corporation to five of its senior managers. Also that year, Gulf and Western sold the U.S. assets of Sega (manufacturing division of Sega Electronics, along with licenses to technology and distribution rights to arcade game library of Sega in the United States for two years) to pinball manufacturer Bally Manufacturing. The Japanese assets of Sega (Sega Enterprises, Ltd., Sega trademarks, and its library of games) are purchased by a group of investors led by David Rosen and Hayao Nakayama the year after. Gulf and Western subsequently folded the former Sega U.S. companies (the old Sega Enterprises, Inc. and Sega Electronics, Inc. were renamed and currently exist as shell companies Ages Entertainment Software LLC and Ages Electronics, Inc., part of CBS Media Ventures) into Simon & Schuster and the old Sega Europe Limited into Paramount Pictures (since renamed several times and currently exist as High Command Productions Limited, part of Viacom International Inc.) Ironically, years later Paramount and Sega would co-produce movies based on the latter's flagship video game franchise, Sonic the Hedgehog.

In 1984, Gulf and Western divested itself of its many Taylor Forge operations to private owners. Taylor Forge's Somerville, New Jersey plant became Taylor Forge Stainless, while its facilities in Paola, Kansas and Greeley, Kansas became Taylor Forge Engineered Systems. Gulf and Western's holdings in the Dominican Republic and Florida were sold to an investment group including Carlos Morales Troncoso and the Fanjul brothers in 1984.

In 1985, Gulf and Western Consumer and Industrial Products Group -- consisting of APS auto parts, Kayser-Roth clothing and Simmons bedding -- was sold to the Wickes Companies. The company, thus restructured, renamed itself Paramount Communications in 1989, and sold Associates First Capital Corporation to the Ford Motor Company.

Headquarters 
Prior to 1970, the company's headquarters were on Madison Avenue in Manhattan.

The Gulf and Western Building (15 Columbus Circle in Manhattan) by Thomas Stanley was built in 1970 for the Gulf and Western company north of Columbus Circle, at the south-western corner of Central Park.

The top of the building sported a restaurant, The Top of the Park, which was never a full success even though run by Stuart Levin, famous for the Four Seasons, Le Pavillon, and other "shrines of haute cuisine," and it being graced with Levin's own elegant signature sculpture by Jim Gary, "Universal Woman."

Similarly, the cinema space in the basement, named Paramount after the picture company that Gulf and Western owned, was closed as the building was sold.

Problems with the 45-story building's structural frame gave it unwanted fame as its base was scaffolded for years and the upper floors were prone to sway excessively on windy days, even leading to cases of nausea akin to motion sickness.

The 1997 renovation into a hotel and residential building, the Trump International Hotel and Tower (One Central Park West) by Costas Kondylis and Philip Johnson, involved extensive renovation of both interior and facades. For example, the 45 stories of the original office tower were converted into a 52-story residential building, enabled by the lower ceiling height of residential spaces. The facade was converted with the addition of dark glass walls with distinctive shiny steel framing.

See also 
 List of Paramount executives

References 

 
American companies established in 1934
Defunct companies based in New York City
Conglomerate companies of the United States
Conglomerate companies established in 1934
Conglomerate companies disestablished in 1989
American companies disestablished in 1989
1934 establishments in Michigan
1989 disestablishments in New York (state)
Predecessors of Paramount Global